"You Better Not Do That" is a song written and sung by Tommy Collins. It was released in 1954 on the Capitol label (catalog no. C-1301). In February 1954, it peaked at No. 2 on the Billboard country and western chart. It was also ranked as the No. 7 record on the Billboard 1954 year-end country and western retail and juke box charts.

See also
 Billboard Top Country & Western Records of 1954

References

American country music songs
1954 songs